The Royal Victorian Order is an order of knighthood awarded by the sovereign of the United Kingdom and several Commonwealth realms. It is granted personally by the monarch and recognises personal service to the monarchy, the Royal Household, royal family members, and the organisation of important royal events. The order was officially created and instituted on 23 April 1896 by Letters Patent under the Great Seal of the Realm by Queen Victoria. It was instituted with five grades, the highest of which was Knight Grand Cross (GCVO), which conferred the status of knighthood on holders (apart from foreigners, who typically received honorary awards not entitling them to the style of a knight).

No limit was placed on the number of appointments which could be made. King Edward VII appointed 97 Knights Grand Cross, plus an additional 239 honorary Knights Grand Cross, between his accession to the throne on 22 January 1901 and his death on 6 May 1910. Of those 97, 6 were members of his own family, 3 were Indian princes, 1 was an archbishop, 31 were already peers and 56 were knights (including 8 baronets). Of the total substantive appointments, 30 were to serving commissioned officers, including General Sir John French and Admiral of the Fleet John Fisher, 1st Baron Fisher. Amongst the civilian appointments was Robert Gascoyne-Cecil, 3rd Marquess of Salisbury, who had been Prime Minister of the United Kingdom three times: 1885–86, 1886–92 and 1895–1902.

The foreign appointments comprised 55 Germans, 26 Austro-Hungarians, 22 Spaniards, 18 Danes, 18 Swedes (including 6 from Sweden and Norway), 16 Frenchmen, 15 Portuguese, 14 Italians, 13 Russians, 12 Greeks, 12 Japanese, 5 Norwegians, 3 Belgians and Bulgarians, 2 Ottoman Turks, and 1 Chinese, Egyptian, Persian and Thai, plus 2 royals of mixed nationality. Royalty feature heavily; the King of Greece was among them, as were the future kings of Norway, Denmark, Greece and Thailand. Also among the honorary appointments are four Prime Ministers: Georgios Theotokis (Greece), Antonio Maura y Montaner (Spain), Arvid Lindman (Sweden) and Pyotr Stolypin (Russia); they feature alongside politicians, military officers and diplomats from numerous European powers as well as China, Egypt, Japan, the Ottoman Empire and Persia.

Appointed by King Edward VII 
The list below is ordered by date of appointment. Full names, styles, ranks and titles are given where applicable, as correct at the time of appointment to the order. Branch of service or regiment details are given in parentheses to distinguish them from offices. The offices listed are those given in the official notice, printed in the London Gazette. Where applicable, the occasion is given that was listed either with the notices or in published material elsewhere, in which case that material is cited.

See also 
 List of Knights Grand Cross of the Royal Victorian Order appointed by Queen Victoria

References

Notes

Citations

Bibliography
 P. Duckers (2004), British Orders and Decorations (Princes Risborough: Shire Publications Ltd)
 D. Dutton, ed. (2001), The War Diary of the 17th Earl of Derby (Liverpool: Liverpool University Press)
 P. Galloway, D. Stanley, D. Martin (1996), Royal Service, volume 1 (London: Victorian Publishing)
 C. McCreery (2008), On Her Majesty's Service: Royal Honours and Recognition in Canada (Toronto: Dundurn Press)
 W.M. Shaw (1906), The Knights of England, volume i (London: Sherratt and Hughes; OCLC 185192520)

British honours system
Royal Victorian Order
Edward VII
Royal Victorian